Twins of Evil: The Second Coming Tour was the second double bill concert tour co-headlined by American rock bands Rob Zombie and Marilyn Manson with special guest Deadly Apples, launched in support of Manson's tenth studio album Heaven Upside Down (2017) and Zombie's sixth solo album The Electric Warlock Acid Witch Satanic Orgy Celebration Dispenser (2016), as well as a vinyl box set released by Zombie on March 30, 2018. The tour was a sequel to the 2012 "Twins of Evil Tour", and visited arena-sized venues from July 11 to August 29 and December 29.

In 2019, the tour was succeeded by the Twins of Evil: Hell Never Dies Tour in the critically acclaimed and commercially successful Twins of Evil franchise.

Background

Following the altercation between the bands' respective lead vocalists during the "Twins of Evil Tour" in 2012 that "almost came to blows," Zombie appeared on Howard Stern's show in 2014 and suggested he was "probably" willing to co-headline a tour with him again; finding the conflict petty. In the six years since the tour ended, the two frontmen privately made amends and decided to embark on another joint tour. Titled Twins of Evil: The Second Coming Tour, ticket presale began on March 19, 2018, followed by general sales on the 24th of the same month.  Canadian band Deadly Apples was announced as the opening act in May.

Initially, only 27 dates were announced. However, this eventually grew to 35. The tour's maiden show was on July 11, 2018, at the DTE Energy Music Center in Detroit.  Zombie took a week-long break in early August to complete production on 3 From Hell while Manson headlined clubs with support from Deadly Apples.

The show on August 8 at Jones Beach Amphitheater in Wantagh was canceled after Deadly Apples' set due to severe weather.

"Helter Skelter"
In advance of the tour, Rob Zombie and Marilyn Manson met in Los Angeles and discussed the possibility of collaborating on a newly recorded song. The pair eventually decided to cover The Beatles' "Helter Skelter", which was released as a one-track digital single on the day the tour commenced—July 11. The recording features instrumental contributions from two former members of Marilyn Manson: guitarist John 5 and drummer Ginger Fish, who both joined Zombie's band soon after departing Manson's. This is Manson's first collaboration with either of these former members since The Golden Age of Grotesque (2003) and The High End of Low (2009), respectively. Zombie said of the cover: "I think it's cool because we dirtied it up, slowed it down and made it even heavier and groovier, but still true to the song". The track peaked at number nine on Billboard Hard Rock Digital Songs, and was performed by both artists together on the first night of the tour.

Critical reception
Billboard praised the tour saying that it made "a big rock show feel like not only the right place to be, but also the best."

Set lists
These set lists are representative of the tour's opening performance on July 11 at the DTE Energy Music Center in Detroit. They are not representative of the set list of all concerts throughout the tour.

 Marilyn Manson:
 "Irresponsible Hate Anthem"
 "Angel with the Scabbed Wings"
 "Deep Six"
 "This Is the New Shit"
 "Disposable Teens"
 "mOBSCENE"
 "Kill4Me"
 "I Don't Like the Drugs (But the Drugs Like Me)" / "The Dope Show"
 "Sweet Dreams (Are Made of This)"
 "Say10"
 "Antichrist Superstar"
 "The Beautiful People"
 "Cry Little Sister"

 Rob Zombie:
 "Meet the Creeper"
 "Superbeast"
 "Well, Everybody's Fucking in a U.F.O."
 "Living Dead Girl"
 "In the Age of the Consecrated Vampire We All Get High"
 "Dead City Radio and the New Gods of Supertown"
 "More Human than Human"
 "The Hideous Exhibitions of a Dedicated Gore Whore"
 "Pussy Liquor"
 "Thunder Kiss '65"
 "Helter Skelter" 
 "Dragula"

Tour dates

Notes

Cancelled or rescheduled shows

Line-up

References

Marilyn Manson (band) concert tours
2018 concert tours
Co-headlining concert tours
Rob Zombie concert tours